Mladen Velimirovic (Belgrade, Yugoslavia) is a film director, screenwriter, producer and photographer.

Personal life
Mladen was raised in a known family of film makers. His father Zdravko Velimirović was a film director, university professor and Principal of Belgrade University, Faculty of Arts and Drama. His mother Ranka Velimirović is a film and television producer and ecologist.

Filmography
 Exaltation 
 Our dear guests 
 Piva
 The Cap of Lovcen
 Njegos in the bay of Kotor
 The Golden Apple
 The holly water of river Lim
 Dream about Beauty
 Water mirror
 Gifts to the home of the sacred warriors
 Touch the sky – Old Mountain
 Magic Waters, documentary, 2008
 Inspiration - Old Mountain, documentary, 2010
 A touch of nature - Mountain Rudnik, documentary, 2011
 Monte Cattaro, documentary, prod. Libra film; Regent Films
 Golija, The Hidden Pearl, documentary, prod. Zastava film; Libra film, 2015 
 Zagarach - Montenegro, 2016

Awards 
 Award for the best environmental film, International film festival Art-Paper, Pitesti, Romania, 2008, for the film: Magic Waters
 Award for the best environmental film, International festival of ecological tourism and film, Lecce, Italy, 2010, for the film: Inspiration - Old Mountain
 The Second Prize of the official film jury, Yperia International film festival, Amorgos, Greece, April 2011, for the film Inspiration - Old Mountain
 Grand Prix for the best environmental film, 47th Tourfilm International festival of ecological tourism and film, Lecce, Italy, May 2011, for the film: A touch of nature - Mountain Rudnik
 Award for the best environmental film with Special jury prize, 15th International film festival DocumentArt, Campulung Muscel, Romania, 2011, for the film: A touch of nature - Mountain Rudnik
 Award for the best environmental film, 14th International film festival Fiscalis, Solin, Croatia, October 2011, for the film: A touch of nature - Mountain Rudnik
 Award for the best environmental film, International film festival Riga tour, Riga, Latvia, 2012, for the film: Inspiration - Old Mountain
 Award for the best environmental film, International film festival Filmat, Warsaw, Poland, 2012, for the film: Inspiration - Old Mountain
 Grand Prix for the best environmental film, Tourfilm International festival of ecological tourism and film, Lecce, Italy, October 2012, for the film: Monte Cattaro
 Award for the environmental film, International film festival, Solin, Croatia, October 2012, for the film: Monte Cattaro
 The Third Prize, Yperia International film festival, Amorgos, Greece, May 2013, for the film: Monte Cattaro
 Award Zlatna buklija, Velika Plana, Serbia, 2014, for the film: Golija, The Hidden Pearl
 Award for the environmental film, International film festival Riga tour, Riga, Latvia, 2015, for the film: Golija, The Hidden Pearl

Exhibitions 
 2012: London - Great Britain - in the year of the Olympics, Riga, Latvia, 2012
 2012: London - Great Britain - in the year of the Olympics, London, UK, 2012
 2012: London - Great Britain - in the year of the Olympics, Athens, Greece, 2012
 2013: Boka Kotorska - Kotor - Crna Gora, Amorgos, Greece, May 2013
 2016: Island of Amorgos and Amorgians, Amorgos, Greece, October 2016

References

External links 
 Festival del cinema Città di Spello 
 Libra film

Photographers from Belgrade
Serbian film directors
Serbian screenwriters
Male screenwriters
Serbian film producers
Film people from Belgrade
Living people
Year of birth missing (living people)